Wolf Lake is an unincorporated community home of Oakridge high school in Egelston Township of Muskegon County in the U.S. state of Michigan.  It is a census-designated place (CDP) for statistical purposes, but has no official status as an incorporated municipality. The population was 4,455 at the 2000 census.  The area included in the CDP includes the entire shoreline of Wolf Lake and extends south of the lake to include an area south of M-46/E. Apple Ave.

Geography

Demographics

As of the census of 2000, there were 4,455 people, 1,670 households, and 1,202 families residing in the community. The racial makeup of the community was 94.30% White, 1.03% African American, 1.23% Native American, 0.09% Asian, 1.41% from other races, and 1.93% from two or more races. Hispanic or Latino of any race were 4.22% of the population.

There were 1,670 households, out of which 36.3% had children under the age of 18 living with them, 53.9% were married couples living together, 12.8% had a female householder with no husband present, and 28.0% were non-families. 22.5% of all households were made up of individuals, and 10.1% had someone living alone who was 65 years of age or older.  The average household size was 2.66 and the average family size was 3.10.

In the community, the population was spread out, with 27.9% under the age of 18, 9.5% from 18 to 24, 29.0% from 25 to 44, 22.3% from 45 to 64, and 11.2% who were 65 years of age or older.  The median age was 34 years. For every 100 females, there were 96.6 males.  For every 100 females age 18 and over, there were 94.0 males.

The median income for a household in the community was $34,799, and the median income for a family was $37,847. Males had a median income of $32,197 versus $25,272 for females. The per capita income for the community was $16,214.  About 6.1% of families and 8.1% of the population were below the poverty line, including 12.5% of those under age 18 and 7.8% of those age 65 or over.

References

Unincorporated communities in Muskegon County, Michigan
Census-designated places in Michigan
Unincorporated communities in Michigan
Census-designated places in Muskegon County, Michigan